The 1957 Appalachian State Mountaineers football team was an American football team that represented Appalachian State Teachers College (now known as Appalachian State University) as a member of the North State Conference during the 1957 NAIA football season. In their second year under head coach Bob Broome, the Mountaineers compiled an overall record of 4–6, with a mark of 2–4 in conference play, and finished fifth in the NSC.

Schedule

References

Appalachian State
Appalachian State Mountaineers football seasons
Appalachian State Mountaineers football